Maryland Route 611 (MD 611) is a state highway in the U.S. state of Maryland.  Known as Stephen Decatur Highway, the state highway runs  from Assateague Island north to U.S. Route 50 (US 50) in West Ocean City.  MD 611 is named for Stephen Decatur, the U.S. naval officer of the early 19th century who was born in nearby Berlin.  The state highway provides access to Assateague State Park and Assateague Island National Seashore via the Verrazano Bridge named for Giovanni da Verrazzano.  MD 611 was first paved in West Ocean City in the mid-1930s.  The highway was extended south to MD 376 at Lewis Corner in the 1940s.  A ferry crossed Sinepuxent Bay to Assateague Island from the southern end of the county highway that continued south from Lewis Corner until MD 611 was extended across the Verrazano Bridge in the mid-1960s.

Route description

MD 611 begins at the parking lot of Assateague State Park on Assateague Island.  The state highway immediately intersects Bayberry Road, which is the access road to Assateague Island National Seashore.  MD 611 heads northwest as a two-lane undivided road and crosses Sinepuxent Bay on the Verrazano Bridge flanked to the south by a pedestrian bridge.  Upon reaching Sinepuxent Neck, the state highway passes the Assateague Island National Seashore visitor center on the southbound side before it curves to the northeast and intersects South Point Road, which leads to Rum Pointe Golf Course and the Ocean City Golf and Yacht Club.  MD 611 passes the entrance to the historic homes Williams Grove and Henry's Grove before passing through the hamlet of Lewis Corner.  In Lewis Corner, the state highway intersects the eastern terminus of MD 376 (Assateague Road), and passes Frontier Town Amusement Park and another historic home, Fassitt House.  MD 611 continues northeast, with residential and commercial development increasing as the highway passes west of the Ocean City Municipal Airport and enters West Ocean City.  After passing the eastern terminus of MD 707 (Old Bridge Road), the state highway expands to four lanes shortly before reaching its northern terminus at US 50 (Ocean Gateway). MD 611 serves as the access road to the Maryland section of Assateague Island, with traffic from points north and west using the route south of MD 376.

History
MD 611 was paved from US 213 (now MD 707) to near the Sinepuxent Road intersection on the southern end of West Ocean City by 1935.  By 1946, the state highway extended north to the US 213 divided highway and south to MD 376 at Lewis Corner.  A ferry began service between the southern end of South Point Road and Assateague Island in 1957; this ferry reached the island at what is now Ferry Landing Road.  The ferry was discontinued following the completion of the Verrazano Bridge in 1964.  MD 611 was extended south from Lewis Corner to the eastern end of the Verrazano Bridge in 1967.  The state highway was extended south along Bayberry Road to Ferry Landing Road in 1969 but was retracted to its present southern terminus by 1995.

Junction list

See also

References

External links

MDRoads: MD 611

611
Maryland Route 611